Wabash Township is one of ten townships in Gibson County, Indiana, United States. As of the 2010 census, its population was 30 and it contained 27 housing units. Wabash Township has no organized seat within the township, as the only settlement is in two river camps Crawleyville and Jimtown. The township seat is Owensville, in Montgomery Township. This area is occasionally referred to as the "Tail of Gibson County", owing to its shape and position within the county. Nevertheless, the township is a panhandle of Gibson County, bordered by the Wabash River to the north, northwest, west, and in some parts, east, even southeast, and by Posey County to the south.

Wabash Township was established in 1838, and named from the Wabash River.

Geography
Lakes in this township include Foote Pond and Goose Pond.

Unincorporated towns
 Crawleyville
 Hickory Ridge
 Jimtown
(This list is based on USGS data and may include former settlements.)

Adjacent townships and precincts
Gibson County
 Montgomery Township (East)
Posey County
 Robb Township (Southeast)
 Bethel Township (Southwest)
Wabash County, IL
 Coffee Precinct (Northeast)
 Compton Precinct (Northwest)
White County, IL
 Gray Township (West)

Education
Wabash Township is served by the South Gibson School Corporation, although optional attendance is available for the MSD of North Posey.

References
 U.S. Board on Geographic Names (GNIS)
 United States Census Bureau cartographic boundary files

External links
 Indiana Township Association
 United Township Association of Indiana

Townships in Gibson County, Indiana
Townships in Indiana